Os Trapalhões na Guerra dos Planetas (lit: The Bunglers in the War of the Planets) is a 1978 Brazilian comedy film directed by Adriano Stuart. It is the thirteenth film of the Brazilian comedy group Os Trapalhões, starring Renato Aragão, Manfried Sant'Anna, Antonio Carlos, and Mauro Faccio. The film is a parody of the American film Star Wars. Outside of Brazil, mainly in English-speaking countries, this film is known by the suggestive title of Brazilian Star Wars. It features characters resembling Luke Skywalker, Princess Leia, Darth Vader, Chewbacca, and Stormtroopers.

Guerra dos Planetas marks Faccio's first appearance in a film as his character Zacarias.

Cast
Renato Aragão as Didi
Manfried Sant'Anna as Dedé
Antonio Carlos as Mussum
Mauro Faccio as Zacarias (his first film with Os Trapalhões)
Pedro Aguinaga as Prince Flick (parody of Luke Skywalker)
Carlos Bucka as Zuco
Wilma Dias as Loya
Carlos Kurt as Igor
Maria Cristina as Princess Myrna (parody of Princess Leia)
Emil Rached as Bonzo (parody of Chewbacca)

Production
Because of the special effects, the film was shot in videotape format, but was later expanded to 35mm in the United States, although there are legal restrictions on showing the material outside Brazil.

References

External links

1978 films
Brazilian comedy films
Brazilian parody films
Os Trapalhões
Parody films based on Star Wars
1970s American films